Thurrock contains 17 parish churches for traditional Church of England parishes that were in existence before 1850. There are a further five parishes, parts of which are within Thurrock, but for which the parish church lies outside the Thurrock unitary authority. During the 19th and 20th centuries, reorganisation created new parishes and churches whilst other parishes were amalgamated and buildings made redundant.

References

 
Thurrock